Denise Martin (married name Plain; born 4 March 1959) is an Australian former cricketer who played as a left-arm medium bowler. She appeared in seven Test matches and 17 One Day Internationals for Australia between 1982 and 1987. She played domestic cricket for Western Australia.

Martin was a member of the Australian team that won the 1982 Women's Cricket World Cup.

References

External links
 
 
 Denise Martin at southernstars.org.au

1959 births
Living people
Cricketers from Perth, Western Australia
Australia women Test cricketers
Australia women One Day International cricketers
Western Australia women cricketers